1 Thessalonians 4 is the fourth chapter of the First Epistle to the Thessalonians in the New Testament of the Christian Bible. It is authored by Paul the Apostle, likely written in Corinth in about 50-51 CE for the church in Thessalonica. This chapter contains an exhortation about a life pleasing to God and describes the circumstances of the Second Coming.

Text
The original text was written in Koine Greek. This chapter is divided into 18 verses.

Textual witnesses
Some early manuscripts containing the text of this chapter are:
Papyrus 30 (3rd century)
Codex Vaticanus (325–350)
Codex Sinaiticus (330–360)
Uncial 0226 (5th century; extant verses: 16–18)
Codex Alexandrinus (400–440)
Codex Freerianus (c. 450; extant verses 7–10, 16–18)
Codex Claromontanus (c. 550)

Keeping the traditions (4:1–2)
Paul wants the believers to 'walk' (cf. ) and to please God according to the commandments or instructions they received from him previously (when he founded the church). Theologian Philip Esler refers to these instructions as "the traditions" and argues that they are distinctive norms of behaviour to be adopted by those who follow Christ.

Purity (4:3–8)
This section deals with the sanctification of the people as the will of God.

Brotherly love (4:9–12)
Paul brought up the subject of 'brotherly love', which he says he does not need to write because the Thessalonians have been 'God-taught' to love one another.

The circumstances of Christ's second coming (4:13–18)

Verse 16
 For the Lord Himself will descend from heaven with a shout, with the voice of an archangel, and with the trumpet of God. And the dead in Christ will rise first.

Verse 17
 Then we who are alive and remain shall be caught up together with them in the clouds to meet the Lord in the air. And thus we shall always be with the Lord.
 "Then we who are alive and remain": See Gill on 1 Thessalonians 4:15.
 "Shall be caught up": This has a sense of happening suddenly, in a moment, in the twinkling of an eye.
 "Together with them": that is, everyone is present at the same time, as "the dead in Christ" being raised and the other still alive being changed, and gathered in one general assembly together.
 "In the clouds": refers to the same cloud which received Jesus at his ascension.
 "To meet the Lord in the air": while Jesus will descend, and then clear the regions of the air of Satan and his followers, because Jesus will not descend on earth yet,as it is not fit yet to receive him until the earth is purged and purified by fire to become a new earth.  Another reason why Jesus will stay in the air, and his believers will meet him there, is that he will take them up with him into the third heaven and preserve them there until the burning of the world is over, and then all the elect of God will descend from heaven as a bride adorned for her husband, and he with them, also when the tabernacle of God will be with men.

See also
 Jesus Christ
 Macedonia
Rapture
 Second Coming
 Related Bible parts: Matthew 24, Matthew 25, John 14, Revelation 2

References

Sources

External links
 King James Bible - Wikisource
English Translation with Parallel Latin Vulgate
Online Bible at GospelHall.org (ESV, KJV, Darby, American Standard Version, Bible in Basic English)
Multiple bible versions at Bible Gateway (NKJV, NIV, NRSV etc.)

04